Janq'u Willk'i (Aymara janq'u white, willk'i gap, "white gap", also spelled Jankho Willkhi) is a mountain in the Andes of Bolivia which reaches a height of approximately . It is located in the Oruro Department, Mejillones Province, Carangas Municipality, and in the Sabaya Province, Sabaya Municipality.

References 

Mountains of Oruro Department